José Guimarães may refer to:

 José Carlos Guimarães (born 1964), former Angolan basketball player and current coach
 José Guimarães (fencer) (born 1965), Portuguese fencer
 José Roberto Guimarães (born 1954), Brazilian former volleyball player and current coach
 José Carlos Guimarães (footballer), Brazilian footballer